David Bruce McDonald (May 20, 1943 – May 19, 2017) was an American professional baseball player. He was a first baseman who appeared in 33 Major League Baseball games as a member of the  New York Yankees and  Montreal Expos.

Career
Born in New Albany, Indiana, McDonald graduated from high school in Grand Island, Nebraska, and attended the University of Nebraska–Lincoln. In nine games, six as the Bronx Bombers' starting first baseman and three as a pinch hitter, he collected three hits and batted .217. He also added a single and a sacrifice fly, for two runs batted in, as Montreal triumphed, 4–2. But McDonald only mustered two more hits with the Expos for the rest of the year—also against the Phillies—and batted only .103.

He spent the remainder of his pro career in the  minor leagues, retiring in 1974.

McDonald registered a total of nine hits, including three doubles and his lone home run, in 62 big-league at bats (.145) with six runs batted in. He was featured on the same baseball card as Thurman Munson, under the title 1970 ROOKIE STARS YANKEES.

He died one day before turning 74 on May 19, 2017.

References

External links

1943 births
2017 deaths
American expatriate baseball players in Canada
Baseball players from Indiana
Binghamton Triplets players
Buffalo Bisons (minor league) players
Columbus Confederate Yankees players
Greensboro Yankees players
Harlan Smokies players
Idaho Falls Yankees players
Major League Baseball first basemen
Montreal Expos players
Nebraska Cornhuskers baseball players
New York Yankees players
Peninsula Whips players
People from New Albany, Indiana
Shelby Colonels players
Statesville Owls players
Syracuse Chiefs players
Tidewater Tides players
Winnipeg Whips players